The canton of Lauzerte is a French former administrative division in the department of Tarn-et-Garonne and region Midi-Pyrénées. It had 4,897 inhabitants (2012). It was disbanded following the French canton reorganisation which came into effect in March 2015. It consisted of 10 communes, which joined the canton of Pays de Serres Sud-Quercy in 2015.

The canton comprised the following communes:

 Bouloc 
 Lauzerte
 Cazes-Mondenard
 Durfort-Lacapelette
 Montagudet
 Montbarla
 Saint-Amans-de-Pellagal
 Sainte-Juliette
 Sauveterre
 Tréjouls

References

Lauzerte
2015 disestablishments in France
States and territories disestablished in 2015